Category 5 may refer to:

Category 5 (album), an album from rock band, FireHouse
Category 5 cable, used for carrying data
Category 5 computer virus, as classified by Symantec Corporation
Category 5 Records, a record label
Category 5 tropical cyclone, on any of the Tropical cyclone scales
 Any of several hurricanes listed at List of Category 5 Atlantic hurricanes or List of Category 5 Pacific hurricanes
Category 5 pandemic, on the pandemic severity index, an American influenza pandemic with a case-fatality ratio of 2% or higher
Category 5 winter storm, on the Northeast Snowfall Impact Scale and the Regional Snowfall Index
 Any of several winter storms listed at list of Northeast Snowfall Impact Scale winter storms and list of Regional Snowfall Index Category 5 winter storms

See also 
Category V (disambiguation)
Class 5 (disambiguation)
Group 5 (disambiguation)
Type 5 (disambiguation)